Staphylinochrous elongata is a species of moth of the Anomoeotidae family. It is found in the Democratic Republic of the Congo.

References

External links
Images

Anomoeotidae
Insects of the Democratic Republic of the Congo
Moths of Africa
Endemic fauna of the Democratic Republic of the Congo